Bucketheadland is the debut studio album by American guitarist and songwriter Buckethead. It was released on John Zornʼs Japanese record label, Avant, in 1992. It features several samples of the 1960s Japanese television series, Giant Robot, amongst guitar riffs and several fast, technical solos. The concept of the album is a tour around the construction of Bucketheadʼs fictional amusement park, “Bucketheadland”. Because of this, the album is divided into sections that relate to distinct areas of the park.  A sequel was released in 2003, simply titled Bucketheadland 2.

Guitar World credited the album as "ushering in [a] new era of virtuosity" in electric guitar playing while ranking its release the 45th greatest moment in electric guitar history.

Track listing

Disc One
Intro (3:21)

Giant Robot (9:17)

Bucketbots Jig (3:19)

Slaughter Zone (23:25)

Computer Master (8:16)

Virtual Reality (3:35)

Home Run Derby (5:18)

I Love My Parents (1:38)

Disc Two (Remixes)

Credits
All compositions by Buckethead, Katella Music, BMI; except "Virtual Reality" composed by Bootsy Collins, Rubber Band Music, BMI and "Giant Robot Theme" composed by Takeo Yamashita. The term "Oh Jeez..." was inspired by Maximum Bob.

Recorded at "Bootzilla Studios"
Engineered by "Casper and Herbie"
Mastered by Howie Weinberg
Produced by Bootsy Collins
Executive producers: John Zorn & Disk Union
Associate producer: Kazunori Sugiyama
All photos by Thi-Linh Le
Designed by Tomoyo TL
Photo-Typesetting by Strong Silent Type

References

External links 

1992 debut albums
Buckethead albums
Avant Records albums